A list of films produced in Egypt in 1994. For an A-Z list of films currently on Wikipedia, see :Category:Egyptian films.

External links
 Egyptian films of 1994 at the Internet Movie Database
 Egyptian films of 1994 elCinema.com

Lists of Egyptian films by year
1994 in Egypt
Lists of 1994 films by country or language